Daniel Shehata is an Austrian film director and screenwriter. His debut film was a British neo-noir crime drama titled The Nautilus Mutiny, which won several critical awards.

References

Year of birth missing (living people)
Living people
Neo-noir
Austrian male screenwriters